Lai Hin is a village and tambon (subdistrict) of Ko Kha District, in Lampang Province, Thailand. In 2005 it had a total population of 5657 people. The tambon contains 6  villages.

References

Tambon of Lampang province
Populated places in Lampang province